FIFAO may refer to:
Fouilles de l'Institut français d'archéologie orientale, a publication of the Institut Français d'Archéologie Orientale
Oran International Arabic Film Festival, or the Festival international du film arabe d'Oran